Berekum Arsenal Football Club is a Ghanaian football club based in Berekum in the Bono region of Ghana, about 30 minutes drive west from Sunyani.  Founded in 1995, They are currently members of the Division One League.

CAF Cup 
In 2006, the club qualified for the CAF Confederation Cup but they were eliminated when they met Petro Atletico in the second round. They previously eliminated Diables Noirs in the first round of the tournament.

Ban 
The club was banned from the MTN FA Cup by the GFA Disciplinary Committee. The club was banned with other 3 clubs after they failed to honor their MTN FA Cup Preliminary round of matches without seeking permit from the GFA and withdrawal alert to the FA.

Relegation 
The club was relegated to the Division One League in 2013. They were relegated after they placed 14th on the league table. Ever since they were relegated, they were claimed to be struggling to get back to the elite division.

2019-20 Players

Performance in CAF competitions
 CAF Confederation Cup: 1 appearance
2006 – Second Round

References

External links
 berekumarsenalfc.com

Arsenal
Arsenal
Association football clubs established in 1995
1995 establishments in Ghana
Sports clubs in Ghana